Carbonic anhydrase-related protein is a protein that in humans is encoded by the CA8 gene. The CA8 protein lacks the catalytic activity of other carbonic anhydrase enzymes. A rare, autosomal recessive form of cerebellar ataxia known as "cerebellar ataxia, mental retardation, and dysequilibrium syndrome 3" (CAMRQ3) is caused by mutations in the CA8 gene.

Function 

The protein encoded by this gene was initially named CA-related protein because of sequence similarity to other known carbonic anhydrase genes. However, the gene product lacks carbonic anhydrase activity (i.e., the reversible hydration of carbon dioxide). The gene product continues to carry a carbonic anhydrase designation based on clear sequence identity to other members of the carbonic anhydrase gene family. The absence of CA8 gene transcription in the cerebellum of the lurcher mutant in mice with a neurologic defect suggests an important role for this acatalytic form.

Interactions 

CA8 has been shown to interact with ITPR1.

References

Further reading

External links
 
 PDBe-KB provides an overview of all the structure information available in the PDB for Human Carbonic anhydrase-related protein 

Biochemistry